Christophe Perrillat-Collomb (born 19 January 1979 in Annecy) is a French cross-country skier who has competed between 1998 and 2015. His lone World Cup victory was in a 4 × 10 km relay event in France in 2004 while Perrillat's best individual finish was eighth in a 15 km + 15 km double pursuit event at Whistler Olympic Park in January 2009.

Competing in two Winter Olympics, he earned his best finish of eighth in the 4 × 10 km relay at Salt Lake City in 2002. Perrillat's best finish at the FIS Nordic World Ski Championships was sixth in the 4 × 10 km relay at Oberstdorf in 2005.

Cross-country skiing results
All results are sourced from the International Ski Federation (FIS).

Olympic Games

World Championships

World Cup

Season standings

Team podiums
 1 victory – (1 ) 
 5 podiums – (5 )

References

External links
 

1979 births
Cross-country skiers at the 2002 Winter Olympics
Cross-country skiers at the 2006 Winter Olympics
French male cross-country skiers
Living people
Olympic cross-country skiers of France
Sportspeople from Annecy